Grande Prairie Transit (colloquially referred to as GP Transit) is the public transportation system in the city of Grande Prairie in northwestern Alberta, Canada. For most of its history, the bus service was operated by private contractors. During that time the Public Works Department was responsible for GP Transit and the vehicles were still owned by the city. In September 2013, the city brought the drivers in-house, allowing the city to have more flexibility in service quality and cost factors.

Six bus routes operate every 30 minutes during peak hours and hourly the rest of the day, with reduced service on Saturdays, Sundays and statutory holidays. Route 7 operates only during peak hours.  The transit terminal is located downtown at the corner of 99th Street and 99th Avenue, adjacent to the Towne Centre Mall, and provides a convenient point for transfers between some bus routes.

Services

Scheduled bus routes
GP Transit operates 7 routes.

Paratransit
Specialized transport services are supplied by the independent Disabled Transportation Society (DTS) of Grande Prairie, which operates five wheelchair accessible vehicles and one fifteen passenger van. The non-profit society is largely funded by the city, supplemented by donations and other fundraising events.

See also

 Public transport in Canada

References

External links
 City of Grande Prairie Public Transit

Transit agencies in Alberta
Grande Prairie